The Madre de Dios River is a river shared by Bolivia and Peru which is homonymous to the Peruvian region it runs through. On Bolivian territory it receives the Beni River, close to the town of Riberalta, which later joins with the Mamore River to become the Madeira River after the confluence. The Madeira is a tributary to the Amazon River.

The Madre de Dios is an important waterway for the department of Madre de Dios, particularly Puerto Maldonado, the largest town in the area, and the capital of the department. Mango farming and gold mining are among the many industries on its beaches. Other important industries the Madre de Dios provides are selective logging and farming, both of which are serious environmental problems. Along the length of the river there are several national parks and reserves, notably Tambopata-Candamo National Park, Manú National Park (also known as Manú Biosphere Reserve) and Bahuaja-Sonene National Park.

Hydrography

The Madre de Dios serves as the largest watershed in the area, as part of the vast Amazon River watershed. The river's main tributaries include on the right: Chivile, Azul, Blanco, Inambari, Tambopata and Colorado rivers and from the left:  Los Amigos, Manú, and Las Piedras.

References

External links
 Madre de Dios Watershed at NASA Earth Observatory
 Stroud Water Research Center Project in Madre de Dios, Peru

Rivers of Peru
International rivers of South America
Rivers of Beni Department
Rivers of Pando Department
Rivers of Madre de Dios Region